Rory Michael Kinnear (born 17 February 1978) is an English actor and playwright who has worked with the Royal Shakespeare Company and the Royal National Theatre. In 2014, he won the Olivier Award for Best Actor for his portrayal of William Shakespeare's villain Iago in the National Theatre production of Othello.

He played Bill Tanner in the James Bond films Quantum of Solace, Skyfall, Spectre and No Time to Die, and in various video games of the franchise. He is the youngest actor to play the role of Bill Tanner. He also won a Laurence Olivier Award for portraying Sir Fopling Flutter in a 2008 version of The Man of Mode by George Etherege, and a British Independent Film Award for his performance in the 2012 film Broken. He starred as all the male inhabitants of the village of Cotson in the horror film Men, and his TV roles include Michael on the BBC comedy Count Arthur Strong (2013–2017), Lord Lucan in the two-part ITV series Lucan, Frankenstein's monster in Penny Dreadful, and the lead role of Prime Minister Michael Callow in "The National Anthem", the first episode of the anthology series Black Mirror. His latest film in 2023 was Bank of Dave.

Early life
Kinnear was born in Hammersmith, London, the son of the actor Roy Kinnear and actress Carmel Cryan. He grew up with two older sisters, Karina and Kirsty. He is the grandson of the Scottish international rugby union and rugby league player Roy Kinnear and the godson of actor Michael Williams. He was educated at Tower House School (leaving in 1991), St Paul's School, London, and Balliol College, Oxford, where he studied English. He then studied acting at the London Academy of Music and Dramatic Art.

Career

Theatre
Kinnear's performances in Phyllida Lloyd's production of Mary Stuart and Trevor Nunn's Hamlet, in which he played Laertes, met with acclaim. He also achieved recognition as the outrageous Sir Fopling Flutter in The Man of Mode at the National Theatre, winning a Laurence Olivier Award and Ian Charleson Award. Other notable theatre work includes the lead in Thomas Middleton's The Revenger's Tragedy, the role of Pyotr in Maxim Gorky's Philistines and the role of Mitia in a stage adaptation of the Nikita Mikhalkov film Burnt by the Sun, all for the National Theatre.

In 2010, he played Angelo in Measure for Measure at the Almeida Theatre. Later in 2010, he played the title role in Hamlet at the National Theatre. The two portrayals won him the best actor award in the Evening Standard drama awards for 2010.

Kinnear appeared in The Last of the Haussmans by Stephen Beresford at the National Theatre during the summer of 2012. The production was broadcast to cinemas around the world on 11 October 2012 through the National Theatre Live programme.

He starred as Iago opposite Adrian Lester in the title role of Othello in 2013 at the National Theatre throughout the summer of 2013. Both actors won the Best Actor award in the Evening Standard Theatre Awards for their roles; the award is normally given to only one actor, but the judges were unable to choose between the two men.

From September 2013, the Bush Theatre in London staged Kinnear's debut play The Herd, directed by Howard Davies.  The play ran at the Steppenwolf Theatre in Chicago beginning 2 April 2015. In October 2017, he appeared in the title role of Young Marx, the premiere production at the Bridge Theatre. He returned to the Olivier Theatre at the National Theatre to star as the title role in Macbeth with Anne-Marie Duff from February 2018.

Opera
For The Threepenny Opera (a "play with songs") at the Olivier Theatre from May to October 2016, Kinnear found his "dormant" singing voice for the role of Macheath. In February 2017, he made his directing debut with The Winter's Tale, a new opera written by Ryan Wigglesworth and based on Shakespeare's play, for English National Opera.

Film
Kinnear portrays Bill Tanner in the Daniel Craig–era James Bond film series after taking over from Michael Kitchen. He is the fourth person to play the character. He has appeared in Quantum of Solace (2008), Skyfall (2012), Spectre (2015) and No Time to Die (2021).   As well as the films, Kinnear also lends his voice and likeness to the Bond video games; GoldenEye 007 (2010), James Bond 007: Blood Stone (2010) and 007 Legends (2012). In 2014, he played the fictional character, Detective Nock, in The Imitation Game based loosely on the biography Alan Turing:The Enigma by Andrew Hodges. In January 2017, he portrayed Ellmann in the Netflix film iBoy. He played Henry Hunt in Mike Leigh's 2018 film Peterloo. In 2022, he played Geoffrey, as well as all of the other male roles, in Alex Garland's A24 horror film Men .

In 2023, Kinnear starred as Burnley wannabe banker Dave Fishwick in the film Bank of Dave, released on Netflix in January 2023.

Television
Further to his theatre work, Kinnear received particularly positive reviews for his sympathetic portrayal of Denis Thatcher in The Long Walk to Finchley (2008), a BBC dramatisation of the early years of Margaret Thatcher's political career, which also starred Andrea Riseborough and Samuel West.

He also starred alongside Lucy Punch and Toby Stephens in the BBC Two series Vexed.
Broadcast on 19 October 2010, he was the co-lead in the BBC4 TV drama, The First Men in the Moon written by and co-starring Mark Gatiss.

In 2011, he provided narration during the BBC Proms production of 'Henry V – suite' arranged by Muir Mathieson during their Film Music Prom. He appeared in the lead role of Prime Minister Michael Callow in "The National Anthem", the first episode of the anthology series Black Mirror.

In July 2012, Kinnear appeared as Bolingbroke in Richard II, a BBC Two adaptation of the play of the same name, with Ben Whishaw as King Richard and Patrick Stewart as John of Gaunt.

From 2013 to 2017, he starred as Michael in the BBC sitcom Count Arthur Strong. He has also appeared in the Channel 4 drama Southcliffe.

In December 2013, he appeared as British peer and suspected murderer Lord Lucan in the two-part ITV series Lucan.

He also appeared as Frankenstein's monster in the Showtime television series Penny Dreadful, which premiered 11 May 2014.

In 2017, he appeared in the British miniseries Guerrilla as a Chief Inspector in the Special Branches.

In 2017, he starred as Robert Lessing in the BBC Two comedy series Quacks, which ridicules the early days of medicine in England.

In 2018, he appeared in the first episode of the fourth series of the BBC One comedy series Inside No. 9, Zanzibar, which being a Shakespearean parody, was written in mainly rhyming couplets, with Rory Kinnear playing identical twins and long-lost sons.

In 2019, Kinnear played Craig Oliver in the Channel 4 television film Brexit: The Uncivil War, and the desperate financial advisor Stephen Lyons in the futuristic series Years and Years.

In 2021, Kinnear played Neo-Nazi Colin Jordan in the television drama Ridley Road and was Edward Williams in the BBC's  The Mezzotint.

In 2022, he starred in Our Flag Means Death.

Radio
In 2010, he played  Jürgen Rahl in the BBC Radio drama Slipstream as a disaffected German pilot who joins a mission to steal an alien spacecraft harboured by the Nazis.

Personal life
Kinnear is engaged to actress Pandora Colin (née Pandora Ormsby-Gore), the daughter of the 5th Baron Harlech and aunt to the current 7th Baron, Conservative sitting peer, Jasset Ormsby-Gore. The couple have a son, Riley, born in 2010, and a daughter, Hope, born in 2014.

Karina Kinnear, Rory's sister, died from coronavirus at the age of 48 in May 2020.

Filmography

Film

Television

Theatre

References

External links

 
 Interview with The Observer
 Wish 143 – short film starring Rory Kinnear
 The First Men in the Moon

1978 births
Alumni of Balliol College, Oxford
Alumni of the London Academy of Music and Dramatic Art
English male film actors
English people of Scottish descent
English male radio actors
English male stage actors
English male television actors
English male voice actors
Laurence Olivier Award winners
Ian Charleson Award winners
Living people
People educated at St Paul's School, London
People educated at Tower House School
Royal Shakespeare Company members
English male Shakespearean actors
20th-century English male actors
21st-century English male actors
People from Hammersmith
Male actors from London